The molecular formula C4H4O4 (molar mass: 116.07 g/mol) may refer to:

 Fumaric acid
 Lactic acid O-carboxyanhydride
 Maleic acid
 Succinate (deprotonated form)